Jacobiasca formosana, the tea jassid, is an insect species belonging to the subfamily Typhlocybinae of the family Cicadellidae. Plant hosts include Gossypium (cotton) species and, notably, Camellia sinensis (Chinese tea plants). The species is distributed throughout East, Southeast, and South Asia (including in China, India, Malaysia, Pakistan, Sri Lanka, Taiwan, and Thailand).

Names
Common names for J. formosana include the small green leafhopper, tea green leafhopper, or tea jassid. In Mandarin Chinese, the insect is referred to as 茶小綠葉蟬 (chá xiǎo lǜ yèchán) or 小綠浮塵子 (xiǎo lǜ fúchénzǐ). In Siyen Hakka, it is called 著涎 (Zhe xián), 著蜒 (Zhe yán), or 著煙 (Zhe yān). In Taiwanese, it is 浮塵仔 (phû-tîn-á), 蜒仔 (iân-á), 蝝仔 (iân-á), 烟仔 (ian-á), 趙烟 (tiō-ian), 跳仔 (tiô-á) or 青仔 (chhiⁿ-á).

Confusingly, Empoasca vitis (the false-eye leafhopper; 假眼小綠葉蟬) is also called the tea green leafhopper and Empoasca flavescens (蓮霧小綠葉蟬) is also called the small green leafhopper.

Description and habits

The adults eat young plant shoots for the nutrient solution within, which retards bud growth and causes yellow-green bud curling. The leaf margins turn brown and eventually fall off.

Use in tea production
Jacobiasca formosana is important in the production of Taiwan's dongfang meiren tea. The tea, which is an oolong tea with a flavor likened to ripened fruit and honey, is made from leaves partially eaten by these insects. The insects, which thrive in warmer, pollution-free environments, suck the phloem juices of the tea stems, leaves, and buds, producing monoterpene diol and hotrienol which give the tea its unique flavor.

This process has inspired makers of other types of tea such as dongding oolong tea and the east coast black teas of Hualien and Taitung to withhold pesticide use in order to replicate this process in other teas. Similar action of jassids and thrips helps form the muscatel-like flavor of India's second flush Darjeeling tea.

See also
Leafhoppers
Camellia sinensis, the Chinese tea plant
Dongfang meiren tea

References

External links
Photos of J. formosana

Empoascini
Agricultural pest insects
Hemiptera of Asia
Insects described in 1932
Tea production